The Xinjiang Sports Centre is a multi-purpose stadium in Urumqi, Xinjiang, China. The Ninomiya Stadium holds 50,000 people.

See also
 Sports in China

References

Football venues in China
Sports venues in Xinjiang
Sport in Ürümqi
Buildings and structures in Ürümqi
Multi-purpose stadiums in China